Alvin Erasga Tolentino is a Filipino Canadian choreographer and dance artist, and the founding Artistic Director of Vancouver, British Columbia's Co.ERASGA Dance.

Early life and education
Tolentino was born in Manila, Philippines. He studied with the Royal Winnipeg Ballet, at York University in Toronto and at the SUNY Purchase and Limon Institute.

Career
Tolentino worked with several dance companies, including EDAM, Lola Dance, Mascall Dance, Kinesis Dance, Kokoro Dance and Karen Jamieson Dance.

In 2000, Tolentino founded Co.ERASGA Dance. As its artistic director, he has choreographed several major works for this company, including  SOLA, BATO/stone, MINORI, VOLT, FIELD, SHE SAID, OrienTik/Portrait, BODYGlass, (with Peter Chin), PARADIS/PARADISE, ADAMEVE-Man/Woman, Shadow Machine and 2011's EXpose, (with Martin Inthamoussú,) some of which toured internationally.

Tolentino's work SOLA has been choreographed for film and was a recipient of two 2001 BC Leo Awards,  and awarded the Grand Prix Video International competition for UNESCO in Paris in 2002.
 
In 2010 Tolentino was awarded the Vancouver Mayor's Arts Award for dance in recognition of his contribution to the city's culture.

In 2012, Tolentino choreographed and performed a solo piece, Colonial  In 2015 he collaborated with Thailand's Pichet Klunchun on a piece entitled Unwrapping Culture.

References 

Year of birth missing (living people)
Living people
Filipino emigrants to Canada
People from Manila
Filipino choreographers
Canadian choreographers